WNWV (107.3 FM) is a commercial radio station licensed to Elyria, Ohio, carrying an alternative rock format known as "107.3 Alternative Cleveland". Owned by Rubber City Radio Group, Inc., the station serves Greater Cleveland and much of surrounding Northeast Ohio. WNWV's studios are located in Akron, while the station transmitter resides off of South Island Road in Grafton. In addition to a standard analog transmission, WNWV is available online.

History

Early years
The station began operations on October 17, 1948, as WEOL-FM, the same day co-owned WEOL (930 AM) signed on. Both stations were owned by the Elyria-Lorain Broadcasting Co., later a subsidiary of the Elyria Chronicle-Telegram and Medina Gazette newspapers. The original studios were located in the Elyria Savings and Trust Building in downtown Elyria.

Originally simulcasting WEOL's programming, by 1960, WEOL-FM started separate programming on the weekdays. Branded as "Formula 107," WEOL-FM played a mixture of automated classical music and pop standards from 2 p.m. until 10 p.m. weekdays, while both WEOL and WEOL-FM played "Sterophonic Hi-Lites" from 9 p.m. to 11 p.m. on Sundays. WEOL-FM assumed a separate identity on December 8, 1965, when it switched its call sign to WBEA, with a mostly automated beautiful music and easy listening format. In the late 1960s, the station got a boost from 15,000 watts to 50,000 watts. Many of the area's top broadcast talents made a stop at WBEA and WEOL early in their careers, including Dick Conrad, Jeff Baxter, David Mark, Ronnie Barrett, Ron Penfound, Jim Mehrling, Rick Martyn and Bob Tayek. In 1981, WBEA picked up the Drake-Chenault "Beautiful Music Plus" format, then adopted a Top 40 format, branded as "B-107."

On January 1, 1987, the station picked up the call sign WCZR and operated as the Cleveland affiliate for Z Rock, a heavy metal rock format originating from the Satellite Music Network in Dallas (later absorbed into ABC Radio); WCZR was only the second station in the U.S. to pick the network up after WZRC (106.7 FM) in Chicago. Despite garnering a cult following in the area and a significant increase of record sales within the genre attributed to WCZR, lackluster ratings and the sudden success of KTWV in Los Angeles's launch wound up precipitating a format change.

Smooth jazz
WCZR changed its call sign to WNWV on November 15, 1987, and re-branded itself as "The Wave"; becoming a charter member of the "Wave Network"—another 24/7 satellite service from the Satellite Music Network—that featured a syndicated version of KTWV's mix of new-age music, soft rock and contemporary jazz; coincidentally, WZRC made the same move simultaneously. The Wave Network's operations and programming originated from SRN studios in Chicago and became independent from KTWV after August 1988. WNWV still shared studio operations with WEOL in downtown Elyria, but also opened up a separate sales office located in the Cleveland suburb of Rocky River. Operations director Chris "Daniels" Eicher also hosted the morning show, and threw the switch initiating the format change; the first song played was "If You Love Somebody Set Them Free" by Sting, which was KTWV's debut song nine months earlier. Coupled with a television ad campaign featuring saxophonist David Sanborn, WNWV saw immediate ratings success, having jumped to a 3.5 share in the Spring 1988 Arbitron ratings, and a 4.5 in the Spring 1988 Birch Survey.

Citing disagreements over changes to the music selections, WNWV dropped the Wave Network on September 18, 1990, for a locally programmed lineup of local hosts. Market veteran Bernie Kimble was hired as program director and midday host; also joining the station were B.J. Hart in morning drive, Denis Cametti in afternoons, Charlene McVie in evenings, and Brian Cruise in overnights. Accordingly, the station renamed itself "Cleveland's Cool FM: 107-3 WNWV", slowly transitioning from a mix of new age, soft rock and contemporary jazz into smooth jazz with the slogan "Smooth Jazz, Fresh Hits," but returned to calling itself "The Wave" in 1994. Bernie Kimble left WNWV in March 1993 to program WJJZ (106.1 FM) in Philadelphia upon that station's launch and was succeeded by Steve Hibbard; he returned in the same position in May 1995 after Hibbard exited. Current Bally Sports Great Lakes personality Al Pawlowski hosted mornings at WNWV back in 1994.

From the late 1990s until 2008, WNWV's airstaff consisted of: Tom Murphy in morning drive; Mark Ribbins in middays; Richard Greer in afternoons; Joan Kelly, Desiray McCray, and eventually Michelle Chase in evenings; Starr D'Avril in overnights; news/traffic reporter Mike Kessler (later known as Mike Gallagher); and weekend hosts Harvey Zay, Mark Sanders, Grace Roberts, Lisa Jeffries, Carmen Kennedy, Frank Macek, Carolyn Carr and Nathan Pope; and syndicated shows hosted by Dave Koz, Ramsey Lewis and Chris Dechant. Other personalities included Dan Steinberg, Lisa Danevich, Sandy Bennett, Larry Adams, Sarah Greer, Cody Brooks, Mark McQuire, Kathy Gudell, Tracey Brich Murphy, Jen Kaminski, Greg Yocum, Tammy Frizzel, Pat Allen and Andrea Morris. Under this iteration of "The Wave", WNWV was a two-time National Association of Broadcasters Marconi Award winner for "Jazz Station of the Year", in 1995 and 2001. In 2003, WNWV became the first station in the Cleveland market to broadcast in the new HD Radio digital format, as well as one of a handful in the country to make the initial switch; WCLV in Lorain was the second.

Bernie Kimble left the station in June 2008 and was replaced as program director by Angie Handa; following Richard Greer's departure that September, Mark Ribbins replaced Greer in afternoon drive, and Handa became midday host. Mike Kessler took over as morning host in July 2009 after Tom Murphy's departure.

Adult album alternative
Elyria-Lorain announced on December 21, 2009, that WNWV would change its smooth jazz format after a 22-year run. Despite having been a perennially strong ratings performer and repeatedly pulling the highest shares among all smooth jazz stations nationwide, the station cited Arbitron's adoption of the Portable People Meter in multiple large markets as the reason for the change; early results in those test markets were showing the format to have a much older demographic than was initially thought. That December 28, after stunting with the sound of a clock ticking for 12 hours, WNWV switched to adult album alternative (AAA) branded as "Boom! 107.3", featuring a mix of alternative and classic rock; "Radio Retaliation" by Thievery Corporation was the first song played. Programming veteran and oWOW Radio founder John Gorman briefly served as a consultant for WNWV during the switch.

"Boom! 107.3" originated a few months earlier on the station's HD2 digital subchannel programmed by Ric "Rocco" Bennett, a onetime personality on WMMS and WENZ; Bennett would become WNWV's program director and afternoon host. Concurrent with WNWV's format switch, WNWV-HD2 switched to the smooth jazz format previously heard on WNWV, retaining the Wave branding. Mark Ribbins assumed the title of WNWV-HD2 program director and also served as afternoon host, but was released that October. From that point, the subchannel played only music without on-air personalities, with Mike Gallagher voicing the top-of-the-hour station identification.

Three weeks after the switch, "Boom! 107.3"—intended as a tribute to Ric Bennett's late coworker and longtime WMMS personality Len "Boom" Goldberg—was abruptly dropped after CBS Radio filed a cease and desist order, as they held an existing trademark to the "Boom" brand (the trademark is currently owned by Urban One). As a result, WNWV temporarily re-branded as "107.3 Cleveland" before settling on "V-107.3"; then-general manager Lonnie Gronek later revealed that there were some misgivings about the "Boom!" brand among the staff in the days leading up to the launch. During this period, WNWV's lineup featured holdover morning host Mike Gallagher (Kessler), midday host Ravenna Miceli, afternoon host/program director Ric "Rocco" Bennett, and evening host/music director Brad Hanson. Weekend programming included Acoustic Café with Rob Reinhart, The House of Blues Radio Hour with Elwood Blues (Dan Aykroyd in character) and The New Music Show with Brad Hanson and Ric "Rocco" Bennett. Inner Sanctum, a showcase of local music, ran Sunday nights from September–December 2011.

Rubber City ownership

Return of "The Wave"
On October 13, 2011, Elyria-Lorain Broadcasting Co. sold WNWV to the Akron-based Rubber City Radio Group for $6.5 million, a deal completed that December 16. Rubber City Radio would then announce it would return WNWV's prior branding as "The Wave", but with an updated smooth AC format, largely centered around jazz-influenced vocals; the format switch took place at 8:30 p.m. on January 3, 2012. Mark Ribbins returned to the station as midday host and program director. Initially, the previous smooth jazz format continued on WNWV-HD2 under the "Wave Classics" branding; that subchannel was discontinued as of January 2013.

Personalities heard on WNWV during this iteration of "The Wave" included market veterans Dan Deely, Grace Roberts and Jason "Pottsy" Potter in mornings; Carmen Kennedy, Mark Ribbins and Lynn Kelly in middays, afternoons and evenings, respectively; Dave Koz's weekly syndicated show also aired on Sunday mornings. After the ownership change, WNWV's studios were moved to the Cleveland suburb of Independence.

JenY 107.3

WNWV quietly dropped the smooth AC format in favor of an all Christmas music format on November 15, 2019, dubbed "Christmas on The Wave". While initially thought to have been a holiday season break from format, reports later surfaced that WNWV would flip to a new format either at or before Christmas 2019. At the same time, mysterious billboards began appearing in the Cleveland area bearing the hashtag #WhoIsJeny, with cryptic social media accounts on Twitter and Instagram set up for the campaign. Local website Cleveland Scene reported that WNWV would "abandon the (smooth AC) format" on December 6, followed by radio news website RadioInsight reporting that the airstaff was set to leave the station. The Plain Dealer confirmed that all of WNWV's on-air staff was released on that day, and that a format change was impending. Several days later, Mark Ribbins tweeted in an apparent allusion to his departure, "I really hope that I don't know #whoisjeny, but I think I really do."

It was ultimately revealed that the #WhoIsJeny campaign was viral marketing for a new format on WNWV, with Rubber City having registered a trademark for "107.3 JENY" that December 23. WNWV dropped the Christmas music format and "Wave" branding on December 30, switching to a temporary simulcast of Akron-market sister station WQMX. This simulcast ended on January 3, 2020, at 9:30 a.m.; after a 30-minute stunting sequence, the station relaunched with a modern adult contemporary format, branded as "jenY 107-3". The first song played was "Feel It Still" by Portugal. The Man. Area media coverage interpreted the launch as "(#WhoIsJeny) isn't about a person, but a generation"; phonetically pronounced as "Jenny", the visual rendering of "jenY" is a word play on "Generation Y", an alternate term for the millennial demographic.

Local personalities included Kathy Vogel and Kris Drew (mornings), Cherise Richards (midday), and Ben McKee (afternoons).

On October 27, 2020, the station shifted to alternative rock.

In November 2021, WNWV switched to a jockless presentation; all local personalities moved to other Rubber City Radio Group stations.

107.3 Alternative Cleveland
The "jenY" branding was dropped on January 17, 2022, in favor of "107.3 Alternative Cleveland".

Local personalities include  AJ DiCosimo (mornings), Brady Marks (middays), Jaci Fox (afternoons), and Carrie Danger (evenings).

References

External links

1948 establishments in Ohio
Modern rock radio stations in the United States
Radio stations established in 1948
NWV